MI-2 or Mi-2 can refer to:

 Michigan's 2nd congressional district
 Mil Mi-2, a light helicopter
 Mission: Impossible 2, a 2000 action spy film 
 Anti-Mi-2 antibodies
 Mi-2 complex, also known as NuRD (nucleosome remodeling deacetylase) complex